The Thieving Magpie (La Gazza Ladra) is a double live album by the British neo-progressive rock band Marillion. It was named after the introductory piece of classical music the band used before coming on stage during the Clutching at Straws tour 1987–1988, the overture to Rossini's opera La gazza ladra, which translates as "The Thieving Magpie".
The album was released shortly after singer Fish's departure from the band (and before Steve Hogarth's arrival) and was intended to document the "Fish years". It complements the band's first live album Real to Reel insofar as there are no overlaps. The Thieving Magpie is not a continuous live recording, but a compilation of tracks recorded at different times and places, with audible gaps between them and different moods on the individual tracks. However, the double vinyl version does include the first side of the UK number one concept album Misplaced Childhood (1985). The CD and cassette version includes the full album, as well as the track "Freaks" – originally the b-side to "Lavender", it was used as the lead single for The Thieving Magpie peaking at no. 18 in the UK.

The album was produced by Christopher "Privet" Hedge, who had been Marillion's sound engineer from early on in their career.

Cover art
The cover was designed by regular Marillion contributor Mark Wilkinson, who went on to work for Fish. The front part contains photorealistic airbrushed renderings of the band members. The back cover features characters found on the covers of the previous albums, i.e. "The Jester" (Script for a Jester's Tear), "The Boy" (Misplaced Childhood), and "Torch" (Clutching at Straws). The inside of the vinyl gatefold sleeve consists of a rather blurred photograph of the band on stage, circa 1986.

Release history
Originally, the album was released on double vinyl and the above-mentioned extended double CD/cassette set. In 2005, EMI Japan released a "vinyl replica" edition, i.e. a CD in a miniaturised version of the original vinyl packaging. The track listing, however, is the same as on the original 2CD version. On 22 June 2009, EMI released a digitally remastered version (along with Recital of the Script and Live From Loreley).

Track listing

Double LP version

Side 1
"Intro: La Gazza Ladra" – 2:45
"Slàinte Mhath" – 4:49 from Clutching at Straws (1987), recorded live at Edinburgh "The Playhouse", December 17/18/19th 1987
"He Knows You Know" – 5:12 from Script for a Jester's Tear (1983), recorded live at Sheffield "City Hall", 6 March 1984
"Chelsea Monday" – 8:00 from Script for a Jester's Tear (1983), recorded live at Leicester "De Montfort Hall", 5 March 1984

Side 2 (Misplaced Childhood Part 1)
"Pseudo Silk Kimono" – 2:19
"Kayleigh" – 3:52
"Lavender" – 2:27
"Bitter Suite" – 7:38
"Heart of Lothian" – 5:12
All 5 tracks recorded live at London "Hammersmith Odeon", 9/10 January 1986

Side 3
"Jigsaw" – 6:24 from Fugazi (1984), recorded live at Sheffield "City Hall", 6 March 1984
"Punch & Judy" – 3:23 from Fugazi (1984), recorded live at Sheffield "City Hall", 6 March 1984
"Sugar Mice" – 6:03 from Clutching at Straws (1987), recorded live at Edinburgh "The Playhouse", December 17/18/19th 1987
"Fugazi" – 8:39 from Fugazi (1984), recorded live at Sheffield "City Hall", 6 March 1984

Side 4
"Script for a Jester's Tear" – 8:45 from Script for a Jester's Tear (1983), recorded live at Sheffield "City Hall", 6 March 1984
"Incommunicado" – 5:23 from Clutching at Straws (1987), recorded live at Edinburgh "The Playhouse", December 17/18/19th 1987
"White Russian" – 6:14 from Clutching at Straws (1987), recorded live at Edinburgh "The Playhouse", December 17/18/19th 1987

Double CD version

CD 1
"Intro: La Gazza Ladra" – 2:45
"Slàinte Mhath" – 4:49
"He Knows You Know" – 5:12
"Chelsea Monday" – 8:00
"Freaks" – 4:06 * recorded live at Mannheim, Germany "Maimarktgelände", 21 June 1986
"Jigsaw" – 6:24
"Punch & Judy" – 3:23
"Sugar Mice" – 6:03
"Fugazi" – 8:39
"Script for a Jester's Tear" – 8:45
"Incommunicado" – 5:23
"White Russian" – 6:14
* CD only

CD 2 (Complete performance of Misplaced Childhood)
"Pseudo Silk Kimono" – 2:19
"Kayleigh" – 3:52
"Lavender" – 2:27
"Bitter Suite" – 7:38
"Heart of Lothian" – 5:12
"Waterhole (Expresso Bongo)" – 2:16
"Lords of the Backstage" – 6:07 (the track is not divided properly here, and continues into the first three parts of Blind Curve)
"Blind Curve" – 5:34 (this track is parts four and five of Blind Curve)
"Childhoods End?" – 2:48
"White Feather" – 4:22
All 10 tracks recorded live at London "Hammersmith Odeon", 9/10 January 1986

Charts

Weekly charts

Year-end charts

Certifications

References

1988 live albums
Marillion live albums